Matthew Baranoski (born July 27, 1993) is an American professional racing cyclist. He rode at the 2015 UCI Track Cycling World Championships. He also competed at the 2016 Summer Olympics in the keirin.

See also
List of Pennsylvania State University Olympians

References

External links
 

1993 births
Living people
American male cyclists
People from Perkasie, Pennsylvania
Cyclists from Pennsylvania
Cyclists at the 2015 Pan American Games
Olympic cyclists of the United States
Cyclists at the 2016 Summer Olympics
Pan American Games competitors for the United States